Milan Rešetar (February 1, 1860 – January 14, 1942) was a linguist, historian and literary critic from Dubrovnik.

Biography
Rešetar was born in Dubrovnik. After the gymnasium in Dubrovnik, he studied classical philology and Slavic languages in Vienna and Graz. He worked as a high-school professor in Koper, Zadar and Split, and later a professor of Slavic studies on the universities of Vienna and Zagreb). He also edited the Croatian edition of "List drevnih zakona" magazine. Rešetar was a student of Vatroslav Jagić. He was a notable member of the Serb-Catholic movement in Dubrovnik. After retirement, he moved to Florence where he died 1942.

The main areas of his works included dialectology and accentology of South Slavic languages, as well as philologically impeccable editions of 15th to 18th century writers for the Yugoslav Academy of Sciences and Arts.

He was one of founders of South Slavic dialectology, investigating features of Štokavian dialects (Der Štokawische Dialect, Vienna, 1907) and Čakavian dialects, and also wrote a monography about Molise Croatian dialect. Milan Rešetar was the most conscientious and diligent commentator on The Mountain Wreath. He was also engaged in the field of numismatics (Dubrovačka numizmatika, 1924-1925), inheriting the interest and coin collection from his father Pavle, the last commander in Kotor during Petar II Petrović-Njegoš's lifetime. The collection is kept at The National Museum in Prague.

Works

He wrote in Croatian, German and Italian.

His most important works include:
"Čakavština i njene nekadašnje i sadašnje granice" (Čakavian Dialect, its Past and Present Boundaries)
 "Štokavski dijalekat" (Štokavian Dialect)
 "Nikša Zvijezdić" of Serbian Chancellery in Dubrovnik fame (1431-1455)
 "Najstariji dubrovački govor" (The Oldest Dialect of Dubrovnik)
 "Najstarija dubrovačka proza" (The Oldest Literature of Dubrovnik).

His works in this area are, with a few exceptions, superseded by later areal linguistics and historical dialectology research. On the other hand, Rešetar's editions of the Renaissance and Baroque poets and playwrights are still the standard printed issues; only  modern computerized textology analyses, done in the Institute for Croatian language and linguistics, have begun to question some aspects of his transliteration choices on the graphemics level. The big part of his work in this area remains highly regarded and confirmed by contemporary textology.

His scientific attitudes towards the Ijekavian Štokavian dialect of Dubrovnik were driven by his own ethnic affiliation—like many other prominent members of the intelligentsia in Dubrovnik of his time.

Convinced that the Serbs and the Croats are one nation in two names, Rešetar held that Serbian and Croatian are one and the same language, and in that conviction he published two versions of its grammar - one with examples in Latin script and examples in Cyrillic script: Elementar-Grammatik der serbischen (kroatischen) Sprache (1916).

He also wrote in German a lengthy book entitled Die serbokroatischen Kolonien süditaliens which was published in Vienna in 1911.

Other works 
 Nikša Zvijezdić, dubrovački srpski kancelar XV. vijeka [Nikša Zvijezdić, A Serbian Chancellor in Dubrovnik in the 15th Century]. In: Glas - Srpska kraljevska akademija, 169 (1936)
 Die serbokroatischen Kolonien Süditaliens, Wien 1911 (Südslawische Dialektstudien; 5; Schriften der Balkankommission, Linguistische Abteilung; 9) (in Italian translatian with bibliography: Le colonie serbocroate nell’Italia meridionale, Campobasso 1997)
 Elementargrammatik der serbokroatischen Sprache, Berlin 1957 (Originally appeared as: Elementargrammatik der kroatischen Sprache/Elementargrammatik der serbischen Sprache, Zagreb 1916)
 Popis dubrovačkih vlasteoskijeh porodica, Godišnjak Dubrovačkog učenog društva "Sveti Vlaho", knj. 1, Dubrovnik, 1929
 Dubrovačka numizmatika, Belgrade 1924/25
 Der Štokavische Dialekt, Wien 1907 (Schriften der Balkankommission, Linguistische Abteilung; 4)
 Antologija dubrovačke lirike [Anthology of  Dubrovnik Lyrics], Belgrade 1894
 'Najstarija dubrovačka proza'' [The Oldest Dubrovnik Literature], Belgrade 1952 (Posebna izdanja : Odeljenje Literature i Jezika / Srpska Akademija Nauka; 192)

References

External links

 
"Vjesnik" newspaper article
 
Tragom akribije Article in "Vijenac" about International scientific meeting about Milan Rešetar in Vienna and Dubrovnik
Josip Lisac: "Milan Rešetar i njegovo doba", Kolo, 9, 1999, 3, 37–42.
Slavonic Library Prague, Czech Republic - Book collection "Ragusiana" from library of Milan Rešetar 

Writers from Dubrovnik
Serb-Catholic movement in Dubrovnik
Dialectologists
Linguists from Croatia
20th-century Croatian historians
People from the Kingdom of Dalmatia
1860 births
1942 deaths
Members of the Serbian Academy of Sciences and Arts
Members of the Croatian Academy of Sciences and Arts
Slavists